The Battle of the Mona Passage was a naval engagement on 19 April 1782 taking place in the aftermath of the Battle of the Saintes between Britain and France during the American Revolutionary War. A British fleet under Rear-Admiral Sir Samuel Hood, pursued a small French fleet under Georges-François de Framond which had managed to escape the victorious British fleet a week earlier. The two fleets met and engaged at the Mona Passage where the British overtook and captured four French ships, two of which were 64-gun ships of the line.

Events

Background

Between 9 April 1782 and 12 April 1782 a British fleet under Admiral George Brydges Rodney engaged and defeated a French fleet under the Comte de Grasse at the battle of the Saintes, thus frustrating French plans for an invasion of Jamaica. The British fleet made its way to Jamaica, from where Rodney ordered Rear-Admiral Sir Samuel Hood's division to seek out any disabled or damaged French ships that had escaped the battle. On 17 April Hood's division of ten ships set out toward Saint-Domingue.

Battle
Both of these ships were in the Mona Passage, the strait separating Hispaniola and Puerto Rico and were making sail for Cap-Français along with several smaller ships, when Hood's squadron spotted the French. These were under the command of Georges-François de Framond and the ships were in a poor state; the French 64-gun ship of the line  under Georges-François de Framond had been damaged in the initial encounter at the battle of the Saintes on 9 April, and the Jason, also 64 guns, had been damaged the following day when it collided with the heavily-damaged . Hood chased down the French ships, the faster copper-sheathed British ships outpacing the damaged French ships.  captured both Jason and Caton at the cost of  four men killed and six wounded, whilst  captured the frigate   at the cost of four killed and eight wounded. Champion captured the frigate , but the latter managed to escape with minimal damage.

Aftermath
Following this victory Hood rendezvoused with Rodney at Port Royal on 29 April. As a result of the damage the fleet had sustained in both battles, repairs took nine weeks.

The captured French ships were taken back to England for further use. Jason was renamed , while Caton was used as a prisoner of war hospital ship and moored off Saltash in Cornwall. She continued in this role well into the Napoleonic Wars. Aimable was renamed HMS Aimable and served in the Royal Navy until 1811. Cérès, a former British sloop by the same name, became HMS Raven; the French recaptured her in January 1783 and sold her in 1791. Framond was court-martialed on 27 February 1783 and found guilty and was expelled from the Navy.

Order of battle

Britain
 (98) - Flagship of Sir Samuel Hood, Capt. John Knight
 (74) - Capt. Thomas Dumaresq
 (64) - Capt. Andrew Sutherland
 (74) - Capt. Robert Linzee
 (74) - Capt. Francis Reynolds
 (74) - Capt. George Bowen
 (64) - Capt. George Wilkinson
 (74) - Capt. Samuel Goodall
 (74) - Capt. James Wallace
 (60) - Capt. Anthony Parrey
 (24) - Capt. Thomas West
 (12) - Fire ship

France
 (64) - Capt. de Framond - Captured
Jason (64) - Capt. de la Marthonie - Captured
 (36) - Escaped
 (32) - Cmdt. de Suzannet - Captured
 (18) - Cmdt. de Paroy - Captured

References
Notes

Citations

Bibliography

External links
  Ships of the Old Navy: HMS Aimable

Mona Passage
Mona Passage
Conflicts in 1782
1782 in the Caribbean
Naval battles of the American Revolutionary War involving France